Debina is a white Albanian & Greek wine grape primarily in the Përmet region in Albania and Zitsa region of Epirus. The grape's high acidity lends itself to sparkling wine production.

Synonyms
Debina is also known under the synonyms Dempina, Ntempina, and Zitsa.

References

Grape varieties of Greece
White wine grape varieties